Leptothorax gredleri is a species of ant belonging to the family Formicidae.

It is native to Europe.

References

gredleri
Hymenoptera of Europe
Taxa named by Gustav Mayr
Insects described in 1855